Roeweriscus is a monotypic genus of Galeodid camel spiders, first described by Aleksei Birula in 1937. Its single species, Roeweriscus paradoxus is distributed in Iran.

References 

Solifugae
Arachnid genera
Monotypic arachnid genera